The 2022–23 ISU Grand Prix of Figure Skating is a series of invitational senior internationals that is held from October 2022 through December 2022. Medals were awarded in the disciplines of men's singles, women's singles, pairs, and ice dance. Skaters earned points based on their placement at each event and the top six in each discipline qualified to compete at the Grand Prix Final in Turin, Italy.

Organized by the International Skating Union, the series sets the stage for the 2023 European, the 2023 Four Continents, and the 2023 World Championships. The corresponding series for junior-level skaters is the 2022–23 ISU Junior Grand Prix.

Schedule 
The series comprises the following events:

Cancelled

Requirements 
Skaters are eligible to compete on the senior Grand Prix circuit if they had reached the age of 15 before July 1, 2022. They are also required to have earned a minimum total score (3/5 of highest score in each discipline at previous Worlds Championships)  at certain international events.

Assignments

Men

Women

Pairs

Ice dance

Changes to preliminary assignments

Skate America

Skate Canada

Grand Prix de France

MK John Wilson Trophy

NHK Trophy

Grand Prix of Espoo

Medal summary

Medal standings

Qualification 
At each event, skaters earned points toward qualification for the Grand Prix Final. Following the sixth event, the top six highest scoring skaters/teams advanced to the Final. The points earned per placement were as follows:

There were originally seven tie-breakers in cases of a tie in overall points:
 Highest placement at an event. If a skater placed 1st and 3rd, the tiebreaker is the 1st place, and that beats a skater who placed 2nd in both events.
 Highest combined total scores in both events. If a skater earned 200 points at one event and 250 at a second, that skater would win in the second tie-break over a skater who earned 200 points at one event and 150 at another.
 Participated in two events.
 Highest combined scores in the free skating/free dance portion of both events.
 Highest individual score in the free skating/free dance portion from one event.
 Highest combined scores in the short program/short dance of both events.
 Highest number of total participants at the events.

If a tie remained, it was considered unbreakable and the tied skaters all advanced to the Grand Prix Final.

Qualification standings 
Bold denotes Grand Prix Final qualification.

Qualifiers

Records and achievements

Achievements 
  Deanna Stellato-Dudek (silver at 2022 Skate America) is the oldest skater to make a Grand Prix podium in any discipline, at age 39.
  Riku Miura / Ryuichi Kihara (gold at 2022 Skate Canada) are the first Japanese pair team to win a Grand Prix event.
  Loena Hendrickx (gold at 2022 Grand Prix de France) won Belgium's first Grand Prix title at the senior level in any discipline.
  Deanna Stellato-Dudek (gold at 2022 Grand Prix de France) is the oldest skater to win a Grand Prix event in any discipline, at age 39.
  Daniel Grassl (gold at 2022 MK John Wilson Trophy) is the first Italian men's singles skater to win a Grand Prix event.
  Deniss Vasiļjevs (silver at 2022 MK John Wilson Trophy) won Latvia's first Grand Prix medal in men's singles.
  Anastasiia Gubanova (bronze at 2022 MK John Wilson Trophy) won Georgia's first Grand Prix medal in women's singles.
  Anastasiia Metelkina / Daniil Parkman (bronze at 2022 Grand Prix of Espoo) won Georgia's first Grand Prix medal in pairs.
  Juulia Turkkila / Matthias Versluis (bronze at 2022 Grand Prix of Espoo) won Finland's first Grand Prix medal in ice dance at either the senior or junior level.
  Riku Miura / Ryuichi Kihara (gold at 2022–23 Grand Prix Final) are the first Japanese pair team to win the Grand Prix Final. They also won Japan's first Grand Prix Final medal in pairs.
  Alexa Knierim / Brandon Frazier (silver at 2022–23 Grand Prix Final) won United States' first Grand Prix Final medal in pairs.
  Sara Conti / Niccolò Macii (bronze at 2022–23 Grand Prix Final) won Italy's first Grand Prix Final medal in pairs at either the senior or junior level.
  Loena Hendrickx (bronze at 2022–23 Grand Prix Final) won Belgium's first Grand Prix Final medal at the senior level in any discipline. She also won Belgium's first Grand Prix Final medal in women's singles at either the senior or junior level.

Top scores

Men

Best total score

Best short program score

Best free skating score

Women

Best total score

Best short program score

Best free skating score

Pairs

Best total score

Best short program score

Best free skating score

Ice dance

Best total score

Best rhythm dance score

Best free dance score

Notes

References

External links 
 ISU Grand Prix at the International Skating Union

ISU Grand Prix of Figure Skating
Grand Prix
Grand Prix